Mo' Living is an EP by the Washington, D.C. rock band Ted Leo and the Pharmacists, released in 2007 by Touch and Go Records. It is a bonus EP that was included with first run pressings of the band's album Living with the Living.

Track listing
All songs written by Ted Leo except where noted.
"Nothing Much to Say"
"Old Souls Know"
"Living with the Living"
"Already Too Late?"
"Rappaport's Testament: I Never Gave Up" (Chumbawamba)
untitled

Performers
Ted Leo – vocals, guitar
Dave Lerner – bass
Chris Wilson – drums

Ted Leo and the Pharmacists albums
2007 EPs
Touch and Go Records EPs